That's the Way Love Goes may refer to:

Albums
 That's the Way Love Goes (Connie Smith album), 1974, named after and containing the Lefty Frizzell song
 That's the Way Love Goes (Merle Haggard album), 1983, named after and containing the Lefty Frizzell song

Songs
 "That's the Way Love Goes" (Johnny Rodriguez), 1973; originally performed by Lefty Frizzell
 "That's the Way Love Goes", a song by Young MC from Brainstorm, 1991
 "That's the Way Love Goes" (Janet Jackson song), 1993
 "That's the Way that Love Goes", a song by Lindsey Buckingham from Seeds We Sow, 2011

See also
That's the Way Love Is (disambiguation)